Anisya Kirillovna Tolstaya (died 1732), was a Russian noblewoman, lady-in-waiting and royal mistress to Tsar Peter the Great.

Life
She was likely related to empress Natalya Naryshkina. She served as maid-of-honour to Natalya Alexeyevna of Russia. After the marriage of Tsar Peter to the future Catherine I of Russia, she was appointed to the court of empress Catherine.  In 1717, she belonged to the entourage accompanying Peter and Catherine to Europe.  She was reportedly for a time a mistress to Peter, which gave her some influence.  

Alexei Petrovich, Tsarevich of Russia appealed not just to Catherine but also to Anisya, as his mother's relative, to ask his father for mercy during his conflict and arrest.

In culture
She is a character in  A. Tolstoy's "Peter the Great".

References

Year of birth missing
1732 deaths
Tsardom of Russia ladies-in-waiting
Mistresses of Peter the Great